Monostilifera is a suborder of nemertean worms belonging to the class Enopla, a class of worms characterized by the presence of a peculiar armature of spines or plates in their proboscis.

Families
 Acteonemertidae
 Amphiporidae 
 Carcinonemertidae
 Cratenemertidae
 Prosorhochmidae
 Tetrastemmatidae

Genus (unassigned family): Quasitetrastemma Chernyshev, 2004

References

 
Hoplonemertea